The pin-tailed green pigeon (Treron apicauda) is a species of bird in the family Columbidae native to Southeast Asia.

Description 

The pin-tailed green pigeon is a medium sized dove, with an average weight of 185-255 grams. Males are 32-36 cm and females are typically 28 cm. It is yellow-green overall, with darker green wing-coverts and scapulars and black outer secondaries and primaries. The males have a golden breast with pinkish hues. The central tail feathers are a bluish-gray and the undertail-coverts a chestnut color. The orbital ring is blue, as is the bill, with a lighter green or yellow tip. The legs and feet are a bright reddish-pink. The females are a duller yellow, with much shorter central tail feathers and dull undertail-coverts. 

The song is described as a soft whistling ku-koo, which is usually paired. The pin-tailed green pigeon also lets out a high pitched doo! call. While in flight, feathers produce a whirring sound.

Taxonomy and Systematics 
The pin-tailed green pigeon was first described by Edward Blyth in 1846.  The species' generic name comes from the Greek trērōn (timid, shy dove), while the specific epithet apicauda is derived from a combination of the Latin apicis (apex or point) and the Latin cauda (tail).  The pin-tailed green pigeon was placed in the genus Sphenerus in the past.

Subspecies 
There are three recognized subspecies of the pin-tailed green pigeon.

 Treron apicauda apicauda.  It is found in Bangladesh, Bhutan, China, Myanmar, Nepal and Thailand. 
 Treron apicauda laotianus.  Previously misspelt laotinus. It is found in the mountains of Laos and Vietnam. 
 Treron apicauda lowei.  It is found in the mountains of Thailand, central Laos, and Vietnam.

Distribution and Habitat 
The pin-tailed green pigeon is found in Bangladesh, Bhutan, Cambodia, China, India, Laos, Myanmar, Nepal, Thailand, and Vietnam.  It inhabits secondary growth and forest, including foothill forests, subtropical and tropical dry forest, and evergreen rainforest. It typically inhabits areas 0 to 1800 meters in elevation. 

Pin-tailed green pigeons are resident birds in some parts of their range, and nomadic in other parts in response to food resources.  In central Vietnam, they will descend to lower elevations during the dry season, which is when many trees are fruiting.

Behavior and Ecology

Diet 
The pin-tailed green pigeon is frugivorous, feeding mainly on fruits and berries in an acrobatic fashion.  The species is gregarious, forming feeding flocks varying from 10-30 birds.  Flocks have been observed descending to the ground to visit salt licks.

Breeding 
Nesting has been observed in April, May, and June in the Himalayan foothills. In other parts of Southeast Asia, pin-tailed green pigeons have been observed breeding year round. The female lays two white eggs in a platformed twig nest, usually 5-6 meters off the ground. Nests have been observed in bamboo thickets, trees, and shrubs. Both parents incubate and feed the young. Individuals have a generational length of approximately 4.2 years.

Conservation Status 
The pin-tailed green pigeon was assessed by the IUCN in 2018 and was listed as a species of least concern, though the population trend is decreasing.  Species is thought to be common across much of its range, though sightings are limited. Scarce in Thailand, and reported as very rare in Bangladesh.

References

pin-tailed green pigeon
Birds of North India
Birds of Nepal
Birds of Eastern Himalaya
Birds of Laos
Birds of Myanmar
Birds of Vietnam
Birds of Yunnan
pin-tailed green pigeon
Taxonomy articles created by Polbot
Taxa named by Edward Blyth